Gaetano Filangieri (22 August 1753 – 21 July 1788) was an Italian jurist and philosopher.

Filangieri was born in San Sebastiano al Vesuvio, in the province of Naples, Italy. He was born the third son of a sibship of the noble family of Filangieri, which putatively had arrived in Campania with the Norman conquests.  His father Caesar, prince of Arianiello, intended him to pursue a military career, which he commenced at the early age of seven, but soon abandoned for the study of the law. At the bar his knowledge and eloquence secured his success.  His defence of a royal decree reforming abuses in the administration of justice gained him the favor of the king, Ferdinand IV of Naples, and his prime minister Bernardo Tanucci, and led in 1777 to an appointments at the court, including as maggiordomo di settimana and gentleman of the chamber for the monarch, and a post as officer of a Royal Guard. In 1782, the death of his uncle Serafino Filangieri, the archbishop of Naples, gained for Gaetano a sizable inheritance, allowing him more time to study and writing.

The first two volumes of his main work, La Scienza della Legislazione, was first published in 1780. The first book contained an exposition of the rules on which legislation in general ought to proceed, while the second was devoted to economic questions. These two books showed him an ardent reformer, and vehement in denouncing the abuses of his time. He insisted on unlimited free trade, and the abolition of the medieval institutions which impeded production and national well-being. Its success was great and immediate not only in Italy, but throughout Europe at large.

In 1783 he married, resigned his appointments at court, and retiring to Cava, devoted himself steadily to the completion of his work. In the same year appeared the third book, relating entirely to the principles of criminal jurisprudence. The suggestion which he made in it as to the need for reform in the Roman Catholic church brought upon him the censure of the ecclesiastical authorities, and it was condemned by the congregation of the Index in 1784. In 1785 he published three additional volumes, making the fourth book of the projected work, and dealing with education and morals.

In 1787 he was appointed a member of the supreme treasury council by Ferdinand I of the Two Sicilies, but his health, impaired by close study and over-work in his new office, compelled his withdrawal to the country at Vico Equense. He died somewhat suddenly of tuberculosis on 21 July 1788, having just completed the first part of the fifth book of his Scienza. He left an outline of the remainder of the work, which was to have been completed in six books.

La Scienza della legislazione has gone through many editions and translations. The best Italian edition is in 8 vols. 8vo. (1807). The Milan edition (1822) contains the Opusculi scelti and a life by Donato Tommasi. A French translation appeared in Paris in 7 vols. 8vo (1786–1798); it was republished in 1822-1824, with the addition of the Opuscies and notes by Benjamin Constant.

According to the Gaetano Filangieri Philosophical Society, one of Filangieri's ardent admirers was Benjamin Franklin, and the two corresponded from 1780 until Filangieri's death in 1788.

Carlo Filangieri, the soldier and statesman, was his son, and Gaetano Filangieri, prince of Satriano was his grandson.

Bibliography

Riflessioni politiche su l'ultima legge del sovrano, che riguarda la riforma dell'amministrazione della giustizia, Naples 1774
La scienza della legislazione, Naples, 1780-1785
Reflexiones sobre la libertad del comercio de frutos, Madrid 1784
Chiesa e convento di S. Lorenzo maggiore in Napoli : descrizione storica ed artistica, Naples, 1833 (about San Lorenzo Maggiore)
L' arte del geometra agrimensore o sia trattato di geometria pratica' - note, Naples, 1841
Il Museo artistico industriale in Napoli: relazione di Gaetano Filangieri, Naples, 1879
Di alcuni dipinti a fresco in S. Pietro a Maiella scoverti per cura di Gaetano Filangieri principe di Satriano, Naples, 1881
La testa del cavallo in bronzo già di casa Maddaloni in via Sedile di Nido, ora al Museo Nazionale di Napoli: ricerche di Gaetano Filangieri, Naples 1882
Chiesa e convento del Carmine Maggiore in Napoli: descrizione storica ed artistica per Gaetano Filangieri, Napoli 1885
La famiglia, le case e le vicende di Lucrezia D'Alagno: documenti per Gaetano Filangieri, Naples. 1886
Catalogo del Museo Civico Gaetano Filangieri principe di Satriano; a cura di B. Capasso, E. Cerillo; con note di G. Filangieri, Napoli 1888
Chiesa e monastero di San Gaudioso in Napoli per Gaetano Filangieri, Naples 1888
Descrizione storica ed artistica della chiesa e convento di Santa Maria delle Grazie Maggiore a Caponapoli per Gaetano Filangieri, Naples 1888
Per la morte di Gaetano Del Pezzo marchese di Campodisola, Naples 1889
Proposte al real governo per la istituzione di addetti industriali e commerciali presso i consolati d'Italia all'estero per Gaetano Filangieri, Napoli 1889
Indice degli artefici delle arti maggiori e minori la più parte ignoti o poco noti ai napoletani e siciliani si delle altre regioni d'Italia o stranieri che operarono tra noi con notizia delle loro opere e del tempo del loro esercizio da studii e nuovi documenti raccolti e pubblicati per cura di Gaetano Filangieri, Napoli
Il mondo nuovo e le virtu civili: l'epistolario di Gaetano Filangieri 1772-1788, Napoli 1999
 Bernardo Cozzolino, San Sebastiano al Vesuvio: Un itinerario storico artistico e un ricordo di Gaetano Filangieri, Edizioni Poseidon, Napoli 2006;
 F.S. Salfi, Franco Crispini (ed.), "Introduzione" di Valentina Zaffino,  Elogio di Filangieri, Cosenza, Pellegrini, 2012,

Notes

External links 
 Biography  

1753 births
1788 deaths
Italian jurists
18th-century Italian philosophers
University of Naples Federico II alumni
Enlightenment philosophers
18th-century Italian male writers
18th-century jurists